Eleanor Purdie (10 January 1872 - 5 May 1929) was an English philologist and the first woman to obtain a doctorate from the University of Fribourg.

Biography
Eleanor Purdie was born in Dalston in 1872 to Elizabeth White Blight and Walter Charles Fry Purdie. Her mother had been a proprietor of a family booksellers in Bideford, who, after her marriage continued to contribute to the family finances by working as a Berlin wool dealer. Her father was a bank clerk who was probably employed by Willis, Percival & Co., bankers in Lombard Street until their demise in 1878. She had two older siblings, Florence (who became Headmistress of the High School, Exeter) and Walter, and a younger brother Cecil.

Purdie attended Notting Hill High School for seven years. In 1889, she obtained a St Dunstan's exhibition, which she then held for three years of undergraduate studies at Newnham College, Cambridge. She obtained a First class in both parts of the Classical Tripos in 1894, gaining a star in Part II and placed top in section E. At the time, women were not awarded degrees by Cambridge University, which posed bureaucratic problems for her when she applied to the University of Fribourg for her doctorate. A Marion Kennedy Studentship enabled her to become the first woman student at Fribourg. After a year of studying Sanskrit, Greek and Indo-European philology, she took a Fellowship at Bryn Mawr College. She obtained a PhD in classical philology from Fribourg in 1896 under the guidance of Wilhelm Streitberg, an Indo-Europeanist.

Purdie taught for a year at her high school, before joining the staff of Cheltenham Ladies' College in 1898. She continued to teach there for 25 years, retiring in 1923 from the position of Senior Classical Mistress.

Besides her doctoral thesis, Purdie wrote several primers for Latin language instruction for high school. It has been pointed out that she also co-edited a collection of essays in comparative philology, although her contributions were relegated to the acknowledgements.

Purdie was active in pedagogy, writing articles on women's education in the US, Germany and Switzerland. She was also part of a movement to unify grammatical terminology, submitting a co-written report that made twenty-five recommendations for the standardisation of usage across languages, modern and ancient.

Purdie died on 5 May 1929, and was interred in the Prestbury churchyard.

Legacy
The Eleanor Purdie Prize for Greek Composition was established in 1936 by Newnham College.

Works

Articles

Books

References

Citations

 

1872 births
1929 deaths
English philologists
Classical philologists
University of Fribourg alumni
Alumni of Newnham College, Cambridge
English classical scholars
Women classical scholars
Women philologists
People educated at Notting Hill & Ealing High School
Cheltenham Ladies' College faculty
People from the London Borough of Hackney
People from Dalston